Sérgio Manoel Júnior, commonly known simply as Sérgio Manoel (born 2 March 1972), is a former professional association footballer who played as an attacking midfielder for several Campeonato Brasileiro Série A clubs, and the Brazil national team.

Club career
Born in Santos, São Paulo state, Sérgio Manoel started his professional career playing for Santos. He played his first professional game for Santos on November 28, 1989. During his career he played for several clubs, winning the Taça Guanabara with Fluminense in 1993, the Campeonato Brasileiro Série A in 1995 and the Torneio Rio-São Paulo in 1998, with Botafogo, and the Campeonato Catarinense in 2004 with Figueirnese. In 2008, he won the Taça Cidade de São Luís with Bacabal, then leaving the club to play with Campeonato Brasileiro Série B club Bragantino.

International career
Sérgio Manoel played three FIFA World Youth Championship games in 1991, respectively against Ivory Coast, Mexico and Sweden, without scoring a goal. Between 1995 and 1998, Sérgio Manoel played five games for the Brazil national team, including two CONCACAF Gold Cup games in 1998, against El Salvador and United States.

Career statistics

Club

International

References

External links
 
 
 

1972 births
Living people
Sportspeople from Santos, São Paulo
Brazilian footballers
Santos FC players
Fluminense FC players
Botafogo de Futebol e Regatas players
Cerezo Osaka players
Grêmio Foot-Ball Porto Alegrense players
Cruzeiro Esporte Clube players
Coritiba Foot Ball Club players
America Football Club (RJ) players
Associação Portuguesa de Desportos players
Madureira Esporte Clube players
Figueirense FC players
Club Atlético Independiente footballers
Marília Atlético Clube players
Volta Redonda FC players
Clube Náutico Capibaribe players
Ceilândia Esporte Clube players
Ceará Sporting Club players
Clube Atlético Bragantino players
Brazil international footballers
Brazil under-20 international footballers
Brazilian expatriate footballers
Expatriate footballers in Argentina
Expatriate footballers in Japan
J1 League players
Argentine Primera División players
Campeonato Brasileiro Série A players
Campeonato Brasileiro Série B players
Campeonato Brasileiro Série C players
Association football midfielders
1998 CONCACAF Gold Cup players